The 2009 Canadian Championship (officially the Nutrilite Canadian Championship for sponsorship reasons) was a soccer tournament hosted and organized by the Canadian Soccer Association that took place in the cities of Montreal, Toronto and Vancouver in 2009. It is the second Canadian Championship held, after the inaugural competition in 2008.

As in the previous tournament, participating teams were the Montreal Impact, Toronto FC and the Vancouver Whitecaps FC. The tournament consisted of a home and away series between each pair of teams for a total of six games. Toronto FC, winners of the tournament, were awarded the Voyageurs Cup and gained entry into the Preliminary Round of the 2009–10 CONCACAF Champions League.

Four of the six matches were broadcast in English by Rogers Sportsnet, while Radio Canada broadcast in French two of Montreal Impact's matches at Vancouver and at home against Toronto FC.

Standings

Matches

Goalscorers

References

External links
 2010 Champions League Qualifying/Canada at official CONCACAF website
 2009 Nutrilite Canadian Championship at official Canadian Soccer Association website

2009
2009 in Canadian soccer
2009 domestic association football cups